The 26th Annual Screen Actors Guild Awards, honoring the best achievements in film and television performances for the year 2019, were presented on January 19, 2020 at the Shrine Auditorium in Los Angeles, California. The ceremony was broadcast live on both TNT and TBS 8:00 p.m. EST / 5:00 p.m. PST. The nominees were announced on December 11, 2019.

Robert De Niro was announced as the 2019 SAG Life Achievement Award recipient on November 12, 2019.

Parasite made history by becoming the first foreign-language film to win Outstanding Performance by a Cast in a Motion Picture.

Winners and nominees
 Note: Winners are listed first and highlighted in boldface.

Film

Television

Screen Actors Guild Life Achievement Award
 Robert De Niro

In Memoriam
The segment honored the following who died in 2019:

 Tim Conway
 Georgia Engel
 Paul Benjamin
 Max Wright
 Phyllis Newman
 Kaye Ballard
 Kristoff St. John
 Ron Leibman
 Caroll Spinney
 Jan-Michael Vincent
 Ken Kercheval
 Diahann Carroll
 Luke Perry
 Verna Bloom
 Peggy Lipton
 Robert Blanche
 Michael J. Pollard
 Russi Taylor
 Bill Macy
 Dick Miller
 Shelley Morrison
 Seymour Cassel
 Arte Johnson
 Katherine Helmond
 Cameron Boyce
 Sue Lyon
 Rip Torn
 Brian Tarantina
 Buck Henry
 Peter Mayhew
 Danny Aiello
 Rutger Hauer
 Robert Forster
 Valerie Harper
 René Auberjonois
 John Witherspoon
 Doris Day
 Albert Finney
 Peter Fonda

Presenters
The following individuals presented awards at the ceremony:

 Dan Levy and Eugene Levy with Outstanding Performance by a Male Actor in a Comedy Series
 Millie Bobby Brown and Jharrel Jerome with Outstanding Performance by a Female Actor in a Comedy Series
 Margaret Qualley, Bruce Dern, and Dakota Fanning introduced Once Upon a Time in Hollywood
 Jason Bateman with Outstanding Performance by an Ensemble in a Comedy Series
 Taron Egerton with Outstanding Performance by a Female Actor in a Supporting Role
 Song Kang-ho, Park So-dam, Choi Woo-shik, Lee Jung-eun, and Lee Sun-kyun introduced Parasite
 Jennifer Garner with Outstanding Performance by a Male Actor in a Supporting Role
 Sophie Turner and Pedro Pascal with Outstanding Performance by a Female Actor in a Television Movie or Miniseries
 Gabrielle Carteris presented SAG-AFTRA
 Gwendoline Christie
 Taika Waititi, Roman Griffin Davis, and Scarlett Johansson introduced Jojo Rabbit
 America Ferrera and Daveed Diggs with Outstanding Performance by a Female Actor in a Drama Series
 Leonardo DiCaprio presented SAG Life Achievement Award
 Steve Buscemi
 Lili Reinhart and Kaitlyn Dever with Outstanding Performance by a Male Actor in a Drama Series
 Anna Paquin, Ray Romano, and Harvey Keitel introduced The Irishman
 Phoebe Waller-Bridge with Outstanding Performance by an Ensemble in a Drama Series
 Nicole Kidman, Margot Robbie, and Charlize Theron introduced Bombshell
 Lupita Nyong'o and Danai Gurira with Outstanding Performance by a Male Actor in a Television Movie or Miniseries
 Sterling K. Brown presented "In Memoriam" segment
 Glenn Close with Outstanding Performance by a Male Actor in a Leading Role
 Tom Hanks with Outstanding Performance by a Female Actor in a Leading Role
 Dan Levy and Eugene Levy with Outstanding Performance by a Cast in a Motion Picture

See also
 24th Satellite Awards
 25th Critics' Choice Awards
 35th Independent Spirit Awards
 40th Golden Raspberry Awards

 47th Annie Awards
 73rd British Academy Film Awards
 77th Golden Globe Awards
 92nd Academy Awards

References

External links
 

2018
2019 film awards
2019 in American cinema
2019 in American television
2019 television awards
2020 in Los Angeles
January 2020 events in the United States
2020 awards in the United States